South Korean boy group Seventeen has released four studio albums, three reissues, one compilation album, 12 extended plays, and 21 singles Since Debut Seventeen has sold a total of 15m copies with all of their albums becoming the 2nd act in South Korea to have multiple albums sold million of copies


Albums

Studio albums

Compilation albums

Reissues

Extended plays

Singles

As lead artist

As collaborating artist

Other charted songs

Soundtrack appearances

Music videos

Notes

References

External links
 

Discography
Discographies of South Korean artists
K-pop music group discographies